The 2022 Asian Women's Club Volleyball Championship  was the 22nd edition of the Asian Women's Club Volleyball Championship, an annual international women’s volleyball club tournament organized by the Asian Volleyball Confederation (AVC) with Kazakhstan Volleyball Federation (KVF).

The tournament was held in Semey, Kazakhstan, from 24 to 30 April 2022. The winner of the tournament qualified to 2022 FIVB Volleyball Women's Club World Championship.

Qualification
Following the AVC regulations, The maximum of 16 teams in all AVC events will be selected by
1 team for the host country
10 teams based on the final standing of the previous edition
5 teams from each of 5 zones (with a qualification tournament if needed)

Due to anticipated difficulty for national federations to field teams due to the COVID-19 pandemic, the AVC allowed two clubs from the same national federation to participate in the case that there are less than 8 federations enter the tournament. In the case of less than 16 entrants, the host is entitled to enter two teams. Only five national federations entered with Kazakhstan the only country to have two representative club.

Qualified associations

 Kazakhstan as host country is entitled to enter two teams if they are less than 16 entrants.
 The PNVF decided to withdraw the F2 Logistics due to lack players and training of the Philippines volleyball team in Brazil. 
 The Japan Volleyball Association decided to withdraw JT Marvelous from the Asian Club Championship due to the COVID-19 infection among their team members.

Squads

Participating teams
The following teams were entered for the tournament.

Venues
The tournament will be host in Abay Arena Cultural and Sports Complex, located in Semey, East Kazakhstan.

Pool standing procedure
 Total number of victories (matches won, matches lost)
 In the event of a tie, the following first tiebreaker will apply: The teams will be ranked by the most point gained per match as follows:
 Match won 3–0 or 3–1: 3 points for the winner, 0 points for the loser
 Match won 3–2: 2 points for the winner, 1 point for the loser
 Match forfeited: 3 points for the winner, 0 points (0–25, 0–25, 0–25) for the loser
 If teams are still tied after examining the number of victories and points gained, then the AVC will examine the results in order to break the tie in the following order:
 Set quotient: if two or more teams are tied on the number of points gained, they will be ranked by the quotient resulting from the division of the number of all set won by the number of all sets lost.
 Points quotient: if the tie persists based on the set quotient, the teams will be ranked by the quotient resulting from the division of all points scored by the total of points lost during all sets.
 If the tie persists based on the point quotient, the tie will be broken based on the team that won the match of the Round Robin Phase between the tied teams. When the tie in point quotient is between three or more teams, these teams ranked taking into consideration only the matches involving the teams in question.

Preliminary round
All times are in Kazakhstan Standard Time (UTC+06:00).

|}

 

|}

Final round
All times are in Kazakhstan Standard Time (UTC+06:00).

3rd place match
|}

Final
|}

Final standing

Awards

Most Valuable Player
 (Kuanysh)
Best Setter
 (Altay)
Best Outside Spikers
 (Altay)
 (Kuanysh)

Best Middle Blocker
 (Altay)
 (Diamond Food–Fine Chef)
Best Opposite Spiker
 (Kuanysh)
Best Libero
 (Kuanysh)

See also
2022 Asian Men's Club Volleyball Championship

References

External links
 Asian Volleyball Confederation

Asian Women's Club Volleyball Championship
Asian Volleyball Club Championship
International volleyball competitions hosted by Kazakhstan
2022 in Kazakhstani sport